"Miles Away" is a power ballad by American rock band Winger, from their album In the Heart of the Young. Released in late 1990 to pop radio after already reaching number one in most AOR markets, the song peaked at #12 on the Hot 100. It is also significant for being Winger's only ever hit single in the United Kingdom, reaching #56 on January 24, 1991. 

The single featured a B-side, "All I Ever Wanted", that was never released on any other Winger albums or compilations, though it did appear, in demo form, on the Demo Anthology.

Background
Paul Taylor stated he wrote “Miles Away” for his girlfriend Emi Canyn who was one of the Nasty Habits, the background singers for Mötley Crüe. The song references "Just When I Needed You Most" by Randy Vanwarmer, another Colorado artist.

Charts

Weekly charts

Year-end charts

References

Winger (band) songs
1990 singles
Song recordings produced by Beau Hill
1990 songs
Glam metal ballads
Atlantic Records singles
1990s ballads